Se Busca un Hombre (Men Wanted) is a Spanish-language telenovela. The main theme of the series tells the story about private lives of a group of women who are frequent clients of “Angelica Style”, a prestigious beauty clinic. This group of women, Angelica, Nora, Mercedes, Samantha, Loreto, Vanesa, Lilí, Gabriela, Fernanda and Cecilia, have one thing in common: they have all failed to find the men of their dreams. As the stories blend, their different personalities are shown and their deepest wishes are revealed. They want to find a man who can understand them with freedom and love.

Cast
 Andrea Noli - Angelica
 Claudia Alvarez - Loreto
 Rodolfo Arias - Dario
 Aaron Baes - Rodrigo
 Rodrigo Cachero - Andres
 Vanessa Ciangherotti - Vanessa
 Augusto Di Paolo - Miguel Angel
 Angela Fuste - Mercedes
 Leonardo Garcia Vale - Bruno
 Miriam Higareda - Diana
 Sergio Kleiner - Pepe Alcantara
 Luis Miguel Lombana - Gonzalo
 Alejandro Lukini - Daniel
 Juan Pablo Medina - Armando
 Anette Michel - Nora
 Leon Michel - Fabian
 Rossana Najera - Lili
 Fernando Noriega - Ariel
 Jesus Ochoa - Tomas
 Mariana Ochoa - Samantha
 Cecilia Piñeiro - Leticia
 Cynthia Rodriguez - Fernanda
 Fernando Sarfatti - Jean Paul
 Omar Germenos - Emilio
 Patrick Fernandez - Paolo

External links

Se Busca Un Hombre

External links
 

2007 telenovelas
2008 telenovelas
2007 Mexican television series debuts
2008 Mexican television series endings
Mexican telenovelas
Spanish-language telenovelas
TV Azteca telenovelas